On May 23, 2017, 8-month-old Reese Annette Bowman (September 4, 2016 – May 23, 2017) was smothered to death by daycare worker Leah Walden. Walden pleaded guilty to the first-degree murder of Bowman on November 27, 2018, and was sentenced to 70 years in prison.

Events
Justin and Amy Bowman both worked and brought their two children, Sawyer and Reese, to Rocket Tiers Learning Center in Baltimore, Maryland. The murder of Reese Bowman occurred on May 23, 2017. It was caught on camera and her brother Sawyer was upstairs at the time it occurred.

When Leah Walden returned from lunch to Rocket Tiers Learning Center, she found that Reese Bowman would not nap. Walden told a co-worker: "Girl, I'm frustrated ... I'm sick of this little bitch. I hate this little bitch. ... She makes me want to punch her in the face." Walden slapped Reese in the crib, then pinned the infant down with one arm as Reese kicked out her legs in desperation. Walden subsequently put a number of blankets over the child's face and smothered her to death. Baltimore's Criminal Investigations Chief Stanley Bradford said: "Watching that video is disturbing. Reese Bowman, in my opinion, was tortured."

Trial
24-year-old Walden initially claimed that Bowman's death was accidental but pleaded guilty to the first-degree murder at trial on November 27, 2018, and was sentenced to 70 years imprisonment. Judge Althea Handy was brought to tears by the surveillance footage captured by the daycare's security cameras of Bowman's murder.

In his victim impact statement, Justin Bowman stated that "Reese Annette Bowman accomplished more in her short life than this woman ever will."

Aftermath
Rocket Tiers Learning Center closed permanently as a result of the murder. Bowman's parents quit their jobs and left Baltimore after their child was murdered. Justin Bowman stated in the trial that he is reduced to tears whenever he sees another father holding a young daughter.

References

2017 in Maryland
2017 murders in the United States
May 2017 crimes in the United States
People murdered in Baltimore
Deaths from asphyxiation
Female murder victims
2010s in Baltimore
Filmed killings